The Monastery of St. Benedict may refer to:

 Monastery of St. Benedict (Norcia), Italy
Monastery of St. Benedict (João Pessoa), Brazil
 Saint Benedict's Monastery (St. Joseph, Minnesota), United States
 St. Benedict's Monastery (Colorado), in Snowmass, Colorado, United States
 Quarr Abbey, a Benedictine Monastery on the Isle of Wight, UK located near Ryde, Isle of Wight, UK
 Benediktbeuern Abbey, an institute of the Salesians of Don Bosco in Benediktbeuern, Bavaria, Germany